Tanner House may refer to:

Places

United States
(by state, then city)

 Tanner Farmhouse, Wilmer, Alabama, listed on the National Register of Historic Places (NRHP)
 William A. Tanner House, Aurora, Illinois, NRHP-listed and in use as the Aurora Historical Museum
 John Tanner House, Petersburg, Kentucky, NRHP-listed
 William C. Tanner House, Falls Township, Ohio, listed on the NRHP in Muskingum County
 Albert H. Tanner House, Portland, Oregon, NRHP-listed
 Henry O. Tanner House, Philadelphia, Pennsylvania, NRHP-listed
 Henry M. Tanner House, Beaver, Utah, listed on the NRHP in Beaver County
 Jake Tanner House, Beaver, Utah, listed on the NRHP in Beaver County
 Sidney Tanner House, Beaver, Utah, listed on the NRHP in Beaver County
 A.N. Tanner House, Grouse Creek, Utah, listed on the NRHP in Box Elder County
 O.H.P. Tanner House, La Crosse, Virginia, NRHP-listed

People
 Tanner House (hockey player) (born 1986), Canadian ice hockey player
See also
 Tanner Houck (born 1996), American baseball player